King's Highway 61, commonly referred to as Highway 61 and historically known as the Scott Highway, is a provincially maintained highway in the Canadian province of Ontario. The  route connects the Pigeon River Bridge, where it crosses into the United States and becomes Minnesota State Highway 61, with a junction at Highway 11, Highway 17 and the Harbour Expressway in Thunder Bay. The highway forms part of the Lake Superior Circle Tour.

Highway 61 was added to the highway system on October 6, 1937, following the amalgamation of the Department of Northern Development into the Department of Highways. Prior to that it was known as the Scott Highway. The bridge over the Pigeon River was originally known as The Outlaw, as it was constructed without formal approval of the Canadian or American governments.

Route description 

Highway 61 begins at the Ontario-Minnesota border at the Pigeon River; the road continues south to Duluth as State Highway 61 on the American side. Proceeding north from the border, the route passes the customs station and curves to the north. Passing its former routing along Highway 593, the highway curves eastward to avoid mountains. It zig-zags around a range of mountains, eventually turning northward and passing to the west of Cloud Bay. The highway continues north for  through Neebing, running between mountain ranges on either side. It rises at Moose Hill, meets Highway 608 and enters one of the few agricultural areas in northwestern Ontario. Shortly thereafter, Highway 61 curves to the east, passing the southern terminus of Highway 130 along the way. It then enters the outskirts of Thunder Bay.

The highway passes Chippewa Road, its former route through Thunder Bay, and returns to its northward orientation. It officially enters the city as it crosses the Kaministiquia River. The highway swerves east at Thunder Bay International Airport as it widens to four lanes then continues north, crossing Arthur Street. North of Arthur Street, the highway is also known as the Thunder Bay Expressway.

The northernmost section in Thunder Bay is a four-lane, undivided expressway. The remainder of Highway 61 is a conventional two-lane highway. Traffic volumes along the southern portion of the highway are generally low, with an annual average daily traffic (AADT) of 1,000 vehicles. This increases progressing north; within Thunder Bay the AADT peaks at 17,200 vehicles.

Highway 61 also forms a small portion of the Lake Superior Circle Tour, a tourist route of highways following the shoreline of Lake Superior. To the south, the tour continues along Minnesota State Highway 61; to the north it continues along Highway 17 towards Sault Saint Marie.

History 

The road that would become Highway 61 was first constructed in 1916. The Pigeon River Timber Company had cleared lands surrounding the towns of Port Arthur and Fort William, but no road existed to connect to locations outside. A narrow wilderness trail reached as far as the Pigeon River, and was chosen as the route for the new road. The Department of Mines and Resources agreed to fund the project, and citizens proceeded to lay a new road as far as the river, beginning in 1913. This road was initially known as the "Scott Highway" after lumberman William Scott. On the opposite shore, Cook County and the State of Minnesota constructed a new road north from Grand Marais. The roads were completed by late 1916, but no bridge existed to connect them.

In response, the Rotary Clubs of Port Arthur and Duluth met to discuss a solution. As an international crossing, any bridge over the river would require federal approval from both governments. Both sides agreed that the approval process would be too slow, and decided to construct the bridge regardless. "The Outlaw" bridge was opened by a travelling motorcade on August 18, 1917, finally permitting travel between Ontario and Minnesota.
To the surprise of the Rotary Clubs, J. E. Whitson, Roads Commissioner of Northern Ontario, and Howard Ferguson, Minister of Lands, Forest and Mines, were present at the opening, and agreed to pay the $768,000 ($ in ) bridge cost. The bridge and the Canadian road approaching it fell under the jurisdiction of the Department of Highways (now the Ministry of Transportation) on April 1, 1937, and the Scott Highway became Highway 61 on October 6. The Outlaw was rebuilt as a steel truss structure in 1934 following several accidents.

By 1962, construction was underway to bypass the inland route of the highway as well as the bridge. This bypass opened on November 1, 1963;
the American approach was rebuilt along the shore of Lake Superior, and a new bridge constructed over the river  to the east. This bridge was opened on May 23, 1964. Highway 61 was realigned as a result; the former route was redesignated as Highway 593 on September 1, 1964.

In 1963, Charles MacNaughton, minister of the Department of Highways, announced plans for the Lakehead Expressway to be built on the western edge of the twin cities of Port Arthur and Fort William (which amalgamated in 1970 to form Thunder Bay).
Construction began in the late 1960s and progressed rapidly.
Following its completion by late 1970, Highway 61 was rerouted along it as far north as Arthur Street.
The former route followed Chippewa Road, turned north on James Street and then east on Frederica Street. From there, it turned north along Ford Street and followed it and Kingsway to Highway 11 and Highway 17 at Arthur Street. This route was renumbered as Highway 61B; it remained in place into the 1990s,
but was decommissioned by 1999.

Beginning in 1991, Highway 61 was completely reconstructed south of Thunder Bay to the border in preparation for the 1995 World Nordic Ski Championships. This involved replacing eight bridges, improving sightlines, and adding five passing lanes and paved shoulders throughout the length of the highway.
The highway was extended  to the north on August 17, 2007, when the Shabaqua Highway opened, redirecting Highway 11 and Highway 17 off Arthur Street.

Major intersections

See also 
 Highway 61, a 1991 film by Canadian director Bruce McDonald.

References

External links 

 The King's Highway 61 at The KingsHighway.ca

061
Highway 061